Boris Konstantinovich Schischkin (born  1886 in Kukarka; died 21 March 1963 in Leningrad) was a Russian botanist and from 1943 corresponding member of the Academy of Sciences of the USSR.

Life and Works 
In 1911 Schischkin graduated from the Faculty of Medicine of Tomsk State University and from 1913 to 1915 he taught there. Between 1915 and 1918 he worked as a military medical officer.

From 1918 to 1925 he headed the botanical section of the Caucasian Museum in Tbilisi. From 1925 to 1930 he was professor at the Tomsk State University, where he held a chair of morphology and plant systematics. From 1930 he worked in the Komarov Botanical Institute of the Academy of Sciences of the USSR (from 1938 to 1949 as director) and from 1945 to 1958 also as professor at Leningrad University. From 1946 to 1963 he was vice-president of the Botanical Society of the USSR. Shishkin's herbarium included more than thirty thousand samples, the majority of which are held in Tomsk.

His main work was concerned with the classification of flowering plants (especially from the families Caryophyllaceae, Umbelliferae and Compositae) and plant geography (Siberia, Transcaucasia). He was the organizer and editor of numerous joint works, including The Flora of the USSR, The Flora of the Byelorussian SSR, the Flora of the Leningrad Oblast and the Flora of Turkmenistan. He was a regional adviser for the Soviet Union on the Flora Europaea project.

Another significant works of the 1900s was 'Flora Rossiae Austro-orientalis' (1927-1936, index in 1938) by Boris Fedtschenko and Schischkin.

Honours 
Shishkin was awarded the USSR State Prize (1952), the Order of Lenin and other medals.

He was an honorary member of the Société Botanique de France and Botanical Society of Washington.

The plant genera Schischkinia Iljin (Compositae) and Schischkinella Steenis (synonym of Gastrocalyx; Caryophyllaceae) were named in his honour. Additionally, a number of species use schischkinii as specific epithet.

References

External links 

Biography in the Great Soviet Encyclopedia (in Russian)
Great Soviet Encyclopedia article translated into English
short biography (in Russian) and photo on the page of the Томская областная универсальная научная библиотека имени А.С. Пушкина

Academic staff of Saint Petersburg State University
Corresponding Members of the USSR Academy of Sciences
Recipients of the Order of Lenin
Soviet botanists
1886 births
1963 deaths
Tomsk State University alumni
Academic staff of Tomsk State University
Burials at Serafimovskoe Cemetery